Paul Andreas Edler von Rennenkampff (tr. ;  or ) was a Baltic German nobleman, military commander and Statesman in the service of the Imperial Russian Army. Rennenkampff was noted for his distinguished roles during the Suppression of the South Ossetians in 1830 and the Crimean War, especially during the Siege of Sevastopol.

Biography

Origin 

The Rennenkampffs was of Westphalian origin and was originated in Osnabrück. He was the great-uncle of the famed World War I general Paul von Rennenkampf.

Family 
As part of a wealthy noble family, Rennenkampff had a lot of siblings, including his older brothers Karl Jakob Alexander von Rennenkampff (1783-1854), a writer, captain and chamberlain in Holstein-Oldenburg, and Gustav Reinhold Georg (1784-1869), an army officer in Saxe-Coburg-Saalfeld, politician and economist. In 1832, Rennenkampff married Anna Maria  (1808-1881), they had one child, Johann Paul Alexander von Rennenkampff (1836-1838). Although some sources claimed that Rennenkampff had another child named Nikolaus Jakob Otto von Rennenkampff, but that was never confirmed. But either way, even if both children existed, neither of them survived through childhood.

Honours and awards

Domestic 
  Order of St. Anna, 4th class (1813)
  Golden sword with the inscription "For Bravery" 
  Order of St. Anna, 1st class with imperial crown (1.1.1831, imperial crown on (14.10.1831)
  Order of St. George, 4th class "For 25 years of service" (1831)
  Order of St. Vladimir, 2nd class (14.3.1842)
  Order of the White Eagle with swords (1855)

Foreign
 :
  Pour le Mérite (1814)
  Order of the Red Eagle, 2nd class with a star (1835)
 :
  Legion of Honour, Knight class (1814)
 :
  Order of the Lion and the Sun, 1st class (1828)
 :
  Order of the Iron Crown, 1st class (1835)
  Kingdom of Denmark:
  Order of Dannebrog, Grand Commander class (1836)

Notes

References

Works cited

 Rennenkampf, Pavel Yakovlevich (Paul Andreas Edler von Rennenkampff) (1790-1857)
 
 
 
 

1790 births
1857 deaths
People from the Governorate of Estonia
Baltic-German people
Russian military personnel of the Napoleonic Wars
Russian military personnel of the Crimean War
People from Tõrva Parish
Imperial Russian Army generals